Schoendoerffer is a surname. Notable people with the surname include:
Frédéric Schoendoerffer, a French actor and writer
Pierre Schoendoerffer, a French director, writer, war reporter, and First Indochina War veteran